Stefan Krastev (born 12 June 1953) is a Bulgarian sports shooter. He competed in the men's 50 metre rifle, prone event at the 1976 Summer Olympics.

References

External links
 

1953 births
Living people
Bulgarian male sport shooters
Olympic shooters of Bulgaria
Shooters at the 1976 Summer Olympics
Place of birth missing (living people)
20th-century Bulgarian people